The 2005 UCI America Tour was the first season for the UCI America Tour. The season began on 8 January 2005 with the Vuelta al Táchira and ended on 17 September 2005 with the Univest Grand Prix.

The points leader, based on the cumulative results of previous races, wears the UCI America Tour cycling jersey. Edgardo Simón of Argentina was crowned as the 2005 UCI America Tour champion.

Throughout the season, points are awarded to the top finishers of stages within stage races and the final general classification standings of each of the stages races and one-day events. The quality and complexity of a race also determines how many points are awarded to the top finishers, the higher the UCI rating of a race, the more points are awarded.

The UCI ratings from highest to lowest are as follows:
 Multi-day events: 2.HC, 2.1 and 2.2
 One-day events: 1.HC, 1.1 and 1.2

Events

Final standings

Individual classification

Team classification

Nation classification

External links

UCI America Tour
2005 in road cycling
UCI
UCI